{{Infobox person
|name          = 
|image         = 
|alt           = 
|caption       =
|birth_name    = 
|birth_date    = April 1888
|birth_place   =
|death_date    =
|death_place   =
|nationality   = 
|other_names   =
|occupation    =
|years_active  =
|known_for     ='The Lango: A Nilotic Tribe of Uganda|notable_works =
| awards = Wellcome Medal for Anthropology (1931)
}}
Jack Herbert Driberg (April 1888 – 5 February 1946) was a British anthropologist. He was a part of the Uganda Protectorate and published The Lango: A Nilotic Tribe of Uganda in 1923.

Personal life and education

Driberg was born in April 1888. He attended Lancing College. He also attended Hertford College. He died on 5 February 1946.

Professional work

Driberg became involved in the Uganda Protectorate in 1912. In 1921 he became involved in service in Anglo-Egyptian Sudan. He wrote The Lango: A Nilotic Tribe of Uganda in 1923. He left Sudan in 1925. He moved back to London, England and attended the London School of Economics. He became faculty in the anthropology department at the University of Cambridge. In 1939 he began serving during World War II.

The Lango: A Nilotic Tribe of Uganda

While in the Uganda Protectorate, Driberg lived with the Langi people in Uganda. In 1923, he wrote The Lango: A Nilotic Tribe of Uganda about his experience. The book is an ethnographic look at the Langi. It includes fables and a Lango-English dictionary.

Further readingPeople of the Small Arrow. Charlottesville: University of Virginia (1930). .The Savage as He Really is''. London: G. Routledge & Sons (1929).

References

English anthropologists
1888 births
1946 deaths
People educated at Lancing College
British ethnologists
20th-century anthropologists
Alumni of Hertford College, Oxford
Uganda Protectorate people
Anglo-Egyptian Sudan people
Alumni of the London School of Economics
Academics of the University of Cambridge